Natale Monferrato (1603–1685) was an Italian baroque composer. He was a pupil of Giovanni Rovetta, then was a singer at St Mark's Basilica in Venice, and then with the aid of Francesco Cavalli vicemaestro, or maestro di coro (1647–76). On 30 April 1676 he became director, after a competition with Giovanni Legrenzi, another of Rovetta's pupils, and Pietro Andrea Ziani. He was earlier maestro at the Mendicanti.

Following his death the junior post of maestro di coro fell to Giandomenico Partenio (1685–89), then Antonino Biffi (1699–1730).

Works, editions and recordings
 Edition: Alma redemptoris mater 1962 - 10 pages
 Edition: Natale Monferrato, Complete Masses, edited by Jonathan R. J. Drennan, Recent Researches in the Music of the Baroque Era, vol. 186 (Middleton, Wis.: A-R Editions, 2014)
 Recording: Alma redemptoris mater; Psalm. Carolyn Watkinson, Gonzaga Band, Chandos Classics, 2011.

References

1603 births
1685 deaths
17th-century Italian composers
Italian Baroque
Italian Baroque composers
Italian male classical composers
17th-century male musicians